Hicham Hacène Ogbi Benhadouche (born August 17, 1989, in Algiers) is an Algerian footballer plays for Bahraini club Al-Muharraq.

Career

Club career
In June 2015, Ogbi signed a contract with MC Oran coming from USM Bel-Abbès.

On 31 July 2021, Ogbi joined Al-Diriyah.

On 24 July 2022, Ogbi joined Al-Muharraq on a one-year deal.

International career
On 2010 Ogbi joined Algeria national military team. He was champion of the Military World Games on 2011 in Rio de Janeiro. This competition is also a part of the World Military Cup.

Honours

With clubs
 Algerian Ligue 1
Champion: 2011-12 with ES Sétif

Algerian Cup
Winner: 2011-12 with ES Sétif

With national team
Military World Games
Champion (1): 2011

References

1989 births
Living people
Algerian footballers
People from Algiers
USM El Harrach players
NA Hussein Dey players
ES Sétif players
USM Bel Abbès players
MC Oran players
MC Oujda players
Damac FC players
Al-Jabalain FC players
Ohod Club players
Khaleej FC players
Al-Diriyah Club players
Al-Muharraq SC players
Algerian Ligue Professionnelle 1 players
Saudi First Division League players
Bahraini Premier League players
Algerian expatriate sportspeople in Saudi Arabia
Expatriate footballers in Saudi Arabia
Algerian expatriate sportspeople in Bahrain
Expatriate footballers in Bahrain
Association football midfielders
US Biskra players
21st-century Algerian people